Michael William Tuke Brown,  (born 14 April 1964) is a British transport executive who was the Commissioner of Transport for London from September 2015, upon his appointment by Mayor of London Boris Johnson, until June 2020.

Following the November 2016 Croydon tram derailment, he was one of two top Transport for London (TfL) officials to decline a performance bonus.

Career
Brown started work for London Underground in 1989, rising to become its Chief Operating Officer in 2003. From 2008 to 2010 he moved to be Managing Director of Heathrow Airport. In 2010, he was appointed Managing Director of London Underground and London Rail. On 16 July 2015, he became Interim Commissioner of Transport for London after the departure of Sir Peter Hendy.

, Brown is a board member of London and Partners, chair of the Strategic Transport Apprenticeship Taskforce, and chair of the National Skills Academy for Rail.

In October 2019, TfL announced that Brown would be leaving his role as Commissioner in May 2020 to chair the Delivery Authority for the restoration of the Houses of Parliament.

In June 2022, he was appointed Chair of the Rail Safety and Standards Board.

Honours and awards 
Brown was appointed Member of the Royal Victorian Order (MVO) in the 2002 Birthday Honours "for services to the Golden Jubilee" for his work at TfL during what has been called "one of the Underground’s greatest-ever organisational challenges".

In 2016, he was awarded an honorary doctorate (LL.D.) by his alma mater, Queen's University Belfast, "for distinction in public service".

In 2020 he was appointed a Commander of the Order of the British Empire (CBE) in the 2020 Birthday Honours for services to Transport.

References

Living people
Alumni of Queen's University Belfast
Members of the Royal Victorian Order
People associated with transport in London
Transport for London
1964 births